Abadeh Abgarm (also Romanized as Ābādeh Ābgarm; also known as Ābādeh) is a village in Farmeshkhan Rural District, in the Central District of Kavar County, Fars Province, Iran. At the 2006 census, its population was 1,525, in 334 families.

References 

Populated places in Kavar County